= Yleinen työttömyyskassa =

Yleinen työttömyyskassa (YTK, English: General Unemployment Fund), formerly known as Loimaan kassa (English: Loimaa Fund), is the largest unemployment fund in Finland. It has over 400,000 members.

Yleinen työttömyyskassa is particularly popular among younger people.
